Pago de Otazu is a branch of Bodega Otazu, a Spanish winery in Navarre, Spain. The Pago de Otazu branch uses the Vino de Pago wine appellation, a classification for Spanish wine applied to individual vineyards or wine estates, unlike the Denominación de Origen Protegida (DOP) or Denominación de Origen Calificada (DOCa) which is applied to an entire wine region. This Vino de Pago is located in the municipality of Echauri, a village only 8 km from Pamplona, the capital of the Foral Community of Navarra, Spain, and it is geographically within the borders of the Navarra DOP. The winery, Bodega Otazu, also sells wines under the Navarra DOP appellation.

Organoleptic characteristics of wines 
Chardonnay variety. Yellow-green color with brilliance and clarity. Complex and powerful aromas, marked by the finesse of the variety. Predominance of the fruity aromas of the variety, citrus, flora, exotic fruit, with some mineral note, something minty and cut grass. Present a mouth with great complexity, balanced and with good amplitude. Harmonic, fresh and pleasant palate. Long finish with memories of the sensations of the nose. In the barrel-fermented version, aging increases the complexity and conditions of the wine. Creamy, milky and toasted aromas will appear, fruit of the new Allier French oak barrel. More creamy and structured.

Tempranillo red variety. Purple, garnet, medium-high color. Nose with a lot of red and black fruit, clean and of good intensity, elegant. Very pleasant on the palate from the start, well-structured, fresh, medium-high body, long finish, hints of fruit. During aging, it develops toasted notes, roasted nuances, tobacco and some liquorice.

Cabernet Sauvignon, red variety. Very high intensity color, dark purple, high layer. On the nose, the notes of the variety, forest fruits, wild fruits, spices, truffles, minerals subtly appear. An aroma of enormous intensity, complexity and subtlety. Once again, the terroir and the weather play their role, providing personality to the variety. Palate with good tannins, structured and robust, tasty, fresh finish, good body. In the aging it will mark more notes of spices, tobacco, cedar (cigar box), minerals, some ink.

Merlot red variety. High intensity color, dark cherry. Nose marked by its intensity, lots of black fruit, berries. Earthy, forest aromas appear. Of great complexity and elegance. Atlantic, marked by the climate of the vineyard. Fleshy, powerful on the palate, the tannins are firm but pleasant, long. In the aging it develops the range of spices, sweet peppers, toasted wood, very complex. A wine marked by the estate's Atlantic terroir.

Authorised grape varieties
The authorised grape varieties are:

 Red: Tempranillo, Merlot, and Cabernet Sauvignon
 White: Chardonnay

References

External links

 Pago de Otazu official website

Wine regions of Spain
Spanish wine
Appellations
Wine classification